Catharina Regina von Greiffenberg (7 September 1633, Viehdorf — 10 April 1694, Nuremberg) was an Austrian poet of the Baroque era. Greiffenberg is one of the most significant German-language writers of the early modern era. Her work is regularly profoundly personal, often taking the form of an internal monologue.

Further reading 
 
 
 
 Martin Bircher (ed.): Sämtliche Werke in 10 Bänden. Millwood NY 1983
 Joy A. Schroeder, "The Prenatal Theology of Catharina Regina von Greiffenberg.”  Lutheran Forum 46/3 (2012):50-56. 
 Lynne Tatlock (ed. and tr.), Catharina Regina von Greiffenberg: Meditations on the Incarnation, Passion, and Death of Jesus Christ (Chicago, 2009) (The Other Voice in Early Modern Europe).
 Kathleen Foley-Beining: The Body and Eucharistic Devotion in Catharina Regina von Greiffenberg's "Meditations".   Camden House: 1997.

External links 
 
 
 
 
 

Austrian baronesses
Austrian women poets
1633 births
1694 deaths